The whitespotted conger (Conger myriaster) (ma-anago) is a marine conger eel, widespread in the Northwest Pacific near the coasts of Japan, Korean Peninsula, and the East China Sea. C. myriaster inhabits shallow sea bottom sand and mud. It is also consumed as food and is a common item on menus in Japan and abroad as anago. Its maximum total length is 100 cm.

References

 Conger myriaster at FishBase

whitespotted conger
Marine fauna of East Asia
whitespotted conger
Articles containing video clips
whitespotted conger